The 2015 women's road cycling season was the second for the  as a UCI women's team and the third year for the team which began as Parkhotel Valkenburg p/b Math Salden in 2013.

Roster

As of 1 January 2015. Ages as of 1 January 2015. 

Riders who joined the team for the 2015 season

Riders who left the team during or after the 2014 season

Season victories

UCI World Ranking

The 2015 UCI Women's Road Rankings are rankings based upon the results in all UCI-sanctioned races of the 2015 women's road cycling season.

Parkhotel Valkenburg finished 20th in the 2015 ranking for UCI teams.

References

External links
 

2015 UCI Women's Teams seasons
2015 in Dutch sport
2015